Trawice  is a settlement placed near Trawickie Lake in the administrative district of Gmina Lipusz, within Kościerzyna County, Pomeranian Voivodeship, in northern Poland.

In Year 1662 Trawice became property of Trawicki Family by polish king Johannes Cassimir

For details of the history of the region, see History of Pomerania.

References

Trawice